Fredler Christophe (born 11 January 2002) is a Haitian professional footballer who plays as a midfielder for French Championnat National 3 team Strasbourg B and the Haiti national team.

Club career
A former youth academy player of Exafoot, Christophe joined French club Strasbourg ahead of 2019–20 season.

International career
Christophe has represented Haiti at different youth levels. He was captain of Haiti under-17 team at 2019 CONCACAF U-17 Championship and 2019 FIFA U-17 World Cup.

In May 2019, Christophe was named in Haiti's 40-man preliminary squad for 2019 CONCACAF Gold Cup. He made his international debut on 1 September 2021 in a 6–1 friendly match defeat against Bahrain.

Career statistics

Club

International

Scores and results list Haiti's goal tally first, score column indicates score after each Christophe goal.

References

External links
 

2002 births
Living people
Association football midfielders
Haitian footballers
Haiti youth international footballers
Haiti international footballers
Championnat National 3 players
Haitian expatriate footballers
Haitian expatriate sportspeople in France
Expatriate footballers in France
People from Ouest (department)